Elections to Derry City Council were held on 5 May 2011 on the same day as the other Northern Irish local government elections. The election used five district electoral areas to elect a total of 30 councillors.

There was no change from the prior election.

Election results

Note: "Votes" are the first preference votes.

Districts summary

|- class="unsortable" align="centre"
!rowspan=2 align="left"|Ward
! % 
!Cllrs
! % 
!Cllrs
! %
!Cllrs
! %
!Cllrs
! % 
!Cllrs
!rowspan=2|TotalCllrs
|- class="unsortable" align="center"
!colspan=2 bgcolor="" | SDLP
!colspan=2 bgcolor="" | Sinn Féin
!colspan=2 bgcolor="" | DUP
!colspan=2 bgcolor="" | UUP
!colspan=2 bgcolor="white"| Others
|-
|align="left"|Cityside
|30.5
|2
|bgcolor="#008800"|54.4
|bgcolor="#008800"|3
|0.0
|0
|0.0
|0
|15.1
|0
|5
|-
|align="left"|Northland
|bgcolor="#99FF66"|48.1
|bgcolor="#99FF66"|4
|39.8
|3
|0.0
|0
|0.0
|0
|12.1
|0
|7
|-
|align="left"|Rural
|bgcolor="#99FF66"|35.6
|bgcolor="#99FF66"|3
|25.2
|1
|28.8
|2
|7.6
|0
|2.8
|0
|6
|-
|align="left"|Shantallow
|bgcolor="#99FF66"|51.4
|bgcolor="#99FF66"|3
|37.3
|2
|0.0
|0
|0.0
|0
|11.3
|0
|5
|-
|align="left"|Waterside
|20.7
|2
|18.4
|1
|bgcolor="#D46A4C"|42.3
|bgcolor="#D46A4C"|3
|11.6
|1
|7.0
|0
|7
|-
|- class="unsortable" class="sortbottom" style="background:#C9C9C9"
|align="left"| Total
|38.2
|14
|33.9
|10
|14.7
|5
|4.0
|1
|9.2
|0
|30
|-
|}

District results

Cityside

2005: 3 x Sinn Féin, 2 x SDLP
2011: 3 x Sinn Féin, 2 x SDLP
2005-2011 Change: No change

Northland

2005: 4 x SDLP, 3 x Sinn Féin
2011: 4 x SDLP, 3 x Sinn Féin
2005-2011 Change: No change

Rural

2005: 3 x SDLP, 2 x DUP, 1 x Sinn Féin
2011: 3 x SDLP, 2 x DUP, 1 x Sinn Féin
2005-2011 Change: No change

Shantallow

2005: 3 x SDLP, 2 x Sinn Féin
2011: 3 x SDLP, 2 x Sinn Féin
2005-2011 Change: No change

Waterside

2005: 3 x DUP, 2 x SDLP, 1 x Sinn Féin, 1 x UUP
2011: 3 x DUP, 2 x SDLP, 1 x Sinn Féin, 1 x UUP
2005-2011 Change: No change

References

Derry City Council elections
Derry